The Newspaper Society of Hong Kong (Chinese:香港報業公會  ), set up on May 10, 1954, is the largest newspaper industrial society in Hong Kong, found by Hong Kong's four largest newspapers at the time - The Kung Sheung Daily News (工商日報, closed), Wah Kiu Yat Po (華僑日報, closed), Sing Tao Daily (星島日報) and South China Morning Post (南華日報). Existing members include 14 major newspapers, although Oriental Daily has chosen not to participate. The Society is the organiser for the widest-acclaimed news awards in Hong Kong.

External links
 Official website 
  History of Hong Kong Newspaper in 50 years (Chinese only)

Newspapers published in Hong Kong
1954 establishments in Hong Kong
Business organisations based in Hong Kong
Organizations established in 1954